In Jewish mythology, Mazzikin (also spelled Mazzikim) are invisible demons which can create minor annoyances or greater dangers. The Hebrew term mazzikin (מַזִּיקִין, also spelled mazzikim מַזִּיקִים), found in the Talmud, means "damagers" or "those who harm". It is generally understood to mean harmful invisible demons that a person could encounter in daily life. Demons or evil spirits do not feature prominently in the Jewish religion, especially as pagans conceived of them, as entities in their own right. They were seen rather to be under the command of God who sent His punishment through them.

References 

Demons in Judaism
Jewish legendary creatures